Chris Hanson may refer to:

Chris Hanson (American football) (born 1976), American football punter
Chris Hanson (golfer) (born 1985), English golfer
Chris Hanson (squash player) (born 1990), American squash player

See also
 Chris Hansen (disambiguation)